Lenny and the Squigtones is a fictional musical group headed in character by Michael McKean and David Lander, the two actors who played Lenny and Squiggy on the U.S. television series Laverne & Shirley, which is set primarily in the 1950s. The group's album, Lenny & Squiggy Present Lenny and the Squigtones, was released on the Casablanca label in 1979. Recorded live at the Roxy Theatre in West Hollywood, they perform parodies of 1950s rock ballads ("Night After Night", "Creature Without a Head"). In between, there a tracks of schtick and banter ("So's Your Old Testament", "Babyland").

The album is now a collector’s item partly because of guitar work by Christopher Guest, who performed under the name "Nigel Tufnel", which he also used in the satirical rock band Spinal Tap, alongside McKean (as "David St. Hubbins"). A band photo on the album's inside cover names two other band members: "Lars Svenki" (keyboard player Murphy Dunne of the Blues Brothers), and "Ming the Merciless" (drummer Don Poncher).

Track listing 

All tracks (except where noted) are credited to Michael McKean and David L. Lander.
Side A 
"Vamp On" 
"Night After Night"
"Creature without a Head"
"King of the Cars" (Michael McKean)
"Squiggy's Wedding Day" 
"Love Is a Terrible Thing"

Side B 
"Babyland" (For Eva Squiggmann) 
"If Only I'd've Listened to Mama" 
"So's Your Old Testament" 
"Sister-in-Law" 
"Honor Farm" 
"StarCrossed" (Michael McKean)
"Only Women Cry" 
"Foreign Legion of Love" 
"Vamp Off"

Credited personnel
Lenny (Michael McKean) - guitar, harmonica, vocals
Squiggy (David L. Lander) - squigophone, vocals
Nigel Tufnel (Christopher Guest) - guitar, clarinet, vocals
Ming The Merciless (Don Poncher) - drums
Lars Svenki (Murphy Dunne) - keyboards, vocals
Dwight Knight (Steve Benderoth) - bass, vocals

with
Jay Seigel - vocal backgrounds

Production credits
Produced by Dave Appell and Hank Medress
Associate producer: Steve Benderoth

References 

1979 debut albums
Fictional musical groups
Casablanca Records albums